Jonesville is an unincorporated community in Butte County, California.

References

Unincorporated communities in California
Unincorporated communities in Butte County, California